

 is a Japanese former professional boxer who competed from 2005 to 2016, having held the WBA (Super) super-featherweight title from 2010 to 2016.

Early life

He was born in Nagasaki Prefecture, grew up in Kasukabe, Saitama, and lives in Tokyo.

Boxing career

Uchiyama compiled an amateur record of 91-22 (59 KOs), including his accomplishments of winning four lightweight titles. He turned professional in 2005, and won his debut via the first round knockout on 16 July. On September 8, 2007, Uchiyama captured the OPBF super featherweight title, then defended it five times. He has been called by a nickname KO Dynamite (Knockout Dynamite) in Japan.

WBA super featherweight champion
Uchiyama won the WBA super featherweight title from Mexican Juan Carlos Salgado via a twelfth round TKO in the latter's first title defence in Tokyo at the Tokyo Big Sight on January 11, 2010. 

On May 17, 2010, he defeated Venezuelan Angel Granados via a sixth round TKO for his first defence at the Saitama Super Arena.

On 31 December, 2015, Uchiyama was slated to fight his eleventh title defense in a row. Uchiyama fought methodically in the opening rounds, and managed to land some big shots on his opponent. He finished it in the third round of the contest with a vicious body shot, to retain his WBA super featherweight belt for the eleventh time.

On April 27, 2016, Uchiyama fought 24-year old Jezreel Corrales. Corrales was aggressive from the opening bell, and shocked Uchiyama by dropping him three times in just two rounds. During the last knockdown, the referee decided he had seen enough and stopped the fight immediately.

On October 3, 2016, it was announced that a contract has been signed for a rematch against Corrales.

The rematch was a very different fight compared to their first matchup. It was more of a tactical battle, in which Uchiyama even managed to drop Corrales in the fifth round. However, Corrales ended up victorious again, with two of the judges awarding him with the win, scoring the fight 117-110 and 115-112 in his favor, while the third judge saw Uchiyama as the winner, scoring the fight 114-113 in his favor.

Professional boxing record

Awards
Amateur
2002 Amateur: Effort Award
2003 Amateur: Valuable Player Award
Professional
Fighter of the Year in Asia (WBA Annual Awards Dinner, 2010)
Boxer of the Month for March, 2011 (WBA)

See also 
List of WBA world champions
List of super featherweight boxing champions
List of Japanese boxing world champions
Boxing in Japan

References

External links

プロボクサー内山高志 Official Web Site 
Takashi Uchiyama - Profile, News Archive & Current Rankings at Box.Live

World Boxing Association champions
World super-featherweight boxing champions
Boxing commentators
Sportspeople from Nagasaki Prefecture
1979 births
Living people
Japanese male boxers